Tropidischia is a genus of camel crickets in the family Rhaphidophoridae. The genus is monotypic, being represented by the single species Tropidischia xanthostoma.

References

Further reading

External links

 

Rhaphidophoridae
Articles created by Qbugbot